Alfred Trassy-Paillogues (born 15 July 1950 in Rouen) is a member of the National Assembly of France.  He represents the Seine-Maritime department,  and is a member of the Union for a Popular Movement.

References

1950 births
Living people
Actors from Rouen
Rally for the Republic politicians
Union for a Popular Movement politicians
Deputies of the 10th National Assembly of the French Fifth Republic
Deputies of the 12th National Assembly of the French Fifth Republic
Deputies of the 13th National Assembly of the French Fifth Republic